The Nicaraguan slider (Trachemys grayi emolli) is a subspecies of turtle in the family Emydidae. The species is indigenous to Nicaragua and Costa Rica.

Taxonomy
Formerly the Nicaraguan slider was considered a subspecies of Trachemys scripta, but was elevated to its own species level by Seidel in 2002. In 2021 it was considered a subspecies of T. grayi by the Turtle Taxonomy Working Group (TTWG).

Etymology
The subspecific name, emolli, is in honor of American herpetologist Edward Moll (E. Moll).

Geographic range
The Nicaraguan slider is native to Nicaragua and Costa Rica, and is found in places such as Lake Nicaragua, Lake Managua, and the lakes and streams that connect them.

Characteristics

The Nicaraguan slider has a carapace with many circular markings on it, and in the middle of each marking, there is a dark spot. The main color of the carapace and the turtle's skin is olive green to dark brown. It also has yellow markings on it as well. The supratemporal markings can be orange, pink, or yellow.

Biology
The Nicaraguan slider likes its water to be around mid-70s to 80 degrees Fahrenheit (24 to 27 degrees Celsius). As far as basking goes, it likes its basking area to be in the high 80s to mid-90s degrees Fahrenheit (30 to 35 degrees Celsius).

Diet
In the wild, the juvenile Nicaraguan slider eats the following: tadpoles, crustaceans, fish, insects and insect larvae.

Breeding
The nesting season of T. g. emolli ranges from about the month of December to May. Females can lay several clutches per season with up to thirty-five eggs per clutch. The hatchlings emerge about 69 to 123 days after the eggs have been deposited.

References

Bibliography

Further reading
Legler, John M. (1990). "The Genus Pseudemys in Mesoamerica: Taxonomy, Distribution, and Origins". pp. 82-105. In: Gibbons, J. Whitfield (editor) (1990). Life History and Ecology of the Slider Turtle. Washington, District of Columbia: Smithsonian Institution Press. 368 pp. . (Pseudemys scripta emolli, new species, p. 91).

Trachemys
Turtles of North America
Reptiles of Costa Rica
Reptiles of Nicaragua
Reptiles described in 1990